This gallery of sovereign state civil flags shows the civil ensigns of sovereign states that appear on the list of sovereign states. Each flag is depicted as if the flagpole is positioned on the left of the flag.

A

B

C

D

E

F

G

H

I

L

M

N

P

S

T

U

V

Other states

See also

Armorial of sovereign states
Flags of micronations
List of national flags by design
List of aspect ratios of national flags
Timeline of national flags

 
flag